The Democratic Party (Ardchilsan Nam) is a centre-right political party in Mongolia.

History

Founding and early years 
After the 1990 democratic revolution, Mongolia became a country with a multi-party system. The democratic revolution transformed Mongolia from a single party communist state into a dynamic democracy. Those who pioneered the democratic revolution established political parties such as the Mongolian National Progress Party and Mongolian Social Democratic Party during the Democratic Revolution. On 6 December 2000, five political parties – including the Mongolian National Democratic Party, Mongolian Social Democratic Party and others merged and established the Democratic Party of Mongolia.

On 1 April 2006, a party convention elected Tsakhiagiin Elbegdorj as the Party Leader. Four candidates ran for the elections and in the first round. Elbegdorj won 46%, Erdeniin Bat-Uul won 40% and two other candidates won the rest. Without an absolute majority, a second ballot between the leading candidates resulted in Tsakhiagiin Elbegdorj winning with 57.2% of votes.

On 30 August 2008, the National Consultative Committee of Democratic Party elected Norovyn Altankhuyag as new leader of the Party.

2012–2016 
In the 2012 parliamentary election, the party won 34 seats in the country's 76-seat unicameral legislature, which was only a handful short of the simple majority requirement to unilaterally govern the country. As such, the party teamed up with ex-President Nambaryn Enkhbayar's Mongolian People's Revolutionary Party and their coalition partner, Mongolian National Democratic Party, to form a government under Norovyn Altankhuyag's premiership. The party's ascension to power coincided with a rapid economic boom largely attributed to the country's mining mega-projects, with The Economist dubbing the country Mine-golia. 

During its first two years in power, the government introduced a number of large scale bonds, with the most significant ones being the Chinggis Bond and the Samurai Bond to fund its ambitious infrastructure projects. Later in 2021, a parliamentary investigation into the Development Bank of Mongolia found a massive mismanagement and favouritism in the loan selection process, prompting the country's anti-corruption agency to launch a full-scale investigation into Norovyn Altankhuyag's involvement in the scandal.

In 2014, the parliamentary Democrats ousted Norovyn Altankhuyag from the party leadership and the premiership, partly due to his failure to reach an agreement with Rio Tinto, and appointed Chimediin Saikhanbileg in a highly controversial move. In 2015, the stagnation of the Chinese economic growth severely impacted Mongolia's economic prospects and damaged the mineral prices, which the country heavily relied on. The country went into an economic recession, with the country's GDP shrinking by about one per cent.

In 2015, Chimediin Saikhanbileg travelled to Dubai to finance the Oyu Tolgoi project and a struck a deal with Rio Tinto and other investors, which was colloquially named the Dubai Agreement. The investment agreement was heavily scrutinised both within and outside the party: Mongolia would not profit from the project at least until 2034. Zandaakhuugiin Enkhbold, who was the Democratic Speaker of the parliament at that time, and a handful of other Democrats condemned the move. In 2016, just a few weeks before his end of term, Saikhanbileg's government relinquished its exclusive right to purchase the 49% stake in the Erdenet mine, one of the most profitable projects in the country, when the Russian side decided to sell it - without any authorisation from the parliament. Saikhanbileg hastily left the country when the country's anti-corruption agency started an investigation on him.

2016–2020 
The party suffered a severe loss in the subsequent parliamentary election, with the opposing Mongolian People's Party obtaining a supermajority in the parliament in 2016. Sodnomzunduin Erdene gained the party's leadership in the 2017 internal election. Khaltmaagiin Battulga, the party's nomination in the 2017 presidential election, won the presidency, and the party also performed slightly better in the 2020 local elections. In the 2020 parliamentary election, the party was only able to increase its number of seats by two, with the Mongolian People's Party winning a supermajority for the second time in a row.

2021–present 
After the party's loss in the 2020 parliamentary election, Sodnomzunduin Erdene handed down his leadership to Tsevegdorjiin Tuvaan, the party's deputy leader at that time. Allegedly, Tuvaan was supposed to call for an internal election according to the party rules, but instead tried to introduce a highly controversial clause into the party rules which would have allowed Khaltmaagiin Battulga to be nominated from the party without any opposition. In response, despite surrendering his leadership a few months earlier, Sodnomzunduin Erdene attempted to take back control of the party, arguing he was still the party's leader since Tsevegdorjiin Tuvaan did not call for a party leadership election. As such, the party was divided into pro- and anti-Battulga factions, each claiming to be the legitimate leadership of the Democratic Party. Odongiin Tsogtgerel became the pro-Battulga faction's leader while Mainbayaryn Tulga became the anti-Battulga faction's leader.

In 2021, the pro-Battulga faction of the party nominated Norovyn Altankhuyag after the Constitutional Court barred Khaltmaagiin Battulga from running for a second term, and the anti-Battulga faction nominated Sodnomzunduin Erdene for the presidential election. The country's electoral commission accepted Sodnomzunduin Erdene's nomination; the party suffered one of its worst defeats in the presidential politics, finishing in the third place, behind the Hun Party, and only around 500 votes more than white-ballots. 

The Supreme Court decided in favour of the anti-Battulga faction, recognising them as the legitimate leadership of the party in 2022. In 2022, the pro-Battulga faction called for an internal election for the second time within a year; in that election, only Khaltmaagiin Battulga and Jambyn Batsuuri registered to run for the leadership. Jambyn Batsuuri dropped out just before the election day, and Khaltmaagiin Battulga won over 96 per cent of the vote. Ganzorigiin Unurbayar, the anti-Battulga faction's secretary general, commented that 'Even the most ruthless dictators are embarrassed of winning 90 per cent of the vote in elections. They say to their sham election officials that 90 per cent is too high, make it 70 or 80.'

The many of the establishment Democrats, including the parliamentary Democratic caucus leader Dashdondogiin Ganbat, ex-President Tsakhiagiin Elbegdorj, ex-Justice Minister Khishigdembereliin Temuujin, Erdeniin Bat-Uul and Damdinsurengiin Sosorbaram, support the anti-Battulga faction whereas the party members in the rural areas of the country tend to support the pro-Battulga faction. During the 2022 Russian invasion of Ukraine, the anti-Battulga faction publicly supported the Ukrainian side and organised protests against the Russian invasion, saying they would 'not allow Mongolia to become the next Belarus', whereas Battulga and his supporters joined the World War II memorial day with the Russian Embassy delegates on 9 May 2022.

Election results
In the 2004 Mongolian parliamentary elections, the party was a constituent part of the Motherland Democratic Coalition that won 44.7% of the popular vote and 34 out of 76 seats at the Parliament. Party leader Tsakhiagiin Elbegdorj became the prime minister of a grand coalition government and held that position until January 2006.

In 2005 Mongolian presidential election, its candidate Mendsaikhany Enkhsaikhan won only 19.7%.

In the 2008 Mongolian parliamentary elections, the Democratic Party won 28 seats out of 76 in the Parliament. After the elections, two major parties (Democratic Party of Mongolia and Mongolian People's Party) formed a coalition government. Within the Government, Party leader Norovyn Altankhuyag became First Deputy Prime Minister and the Party keeps the seats of Finance Minister, Health Minister, Minister of Environment and Tourism, Minister of Roads, Transportation, Construction and Urban Development, and Minister of Defense.

2009 presidential election

At the Democratic Party's convention on 3 April 2009, Tsakhiagiin Elbegdorj defeated Erdeniin Bat-Üül in a contest for the Party's nomination for the Presidency of Mongolia in 2009. Elbegdorj won with 65.3% of the total vote. After Elbegdorj was announced as the candidate, the Civic Will Party and the Mongolian Green Party endorsed Elbegdorj's presidential candidacy.

Tsakhiagiin Elbegdorj won the 2009 Mongolian presidential election on 24 May 2009 with 51.21% of the votes. Defeating incumbent president Enkhbayar who got 47.41%. Elbegdorj was sworn into office as President of Mongolia on 18 June 2009.

2012 parliamentary elections

In the 2012 Mongolian parliamentary elections, the Democratic Party won the elections and became the majority by winning 34 seats out of 76 seat in the Parliament. Party Leader Norovyn Altankhuyag became the Prime Minister. It formed a coalition government with the Mongolian People's Revolutionary Party with majority seats at the Government Cabinet belonging to the Democratic Party.

2013 presidential election

 The Democratic Party's National Consultative Committee held its convention on 7 May 2013 and decided to re-nominate Elbegdorj as a presidential candidate with 100% votes. And the Congress of Democratic Party, with 7,000 participants in Ulaanbaatar plus participants in all provincial centers connected via live internet video conference voted 100% for Elbegdorj's nomination from the Democratic Party for the 2013 presidential election on 8 May 2013. Civil Will-Green Party and Mongolian National Democratic Party – which have seats at both the parliament and the government cabinet – endorsed Elbegdorj's presidential candidacy. The Republican Party and the Motherland Party expressed their full support for Elbegdorj's candidacy also.

Elbegdorj won the 2013 Mongolian presidential election on 26 June 2013 with 50.23% of total votes while opposition Mongolian People's Party's candidate Badmaanyambuugiin Bat-Erdene received 41.97%, and Natsagiin Udval, candidate of Mongolian People's Revolutionary Party got 6.5% of total votes.

2016 parliamentary elections

In the 2016 Mongolian parliamentary elections, the Democratic Party lost to a landslide victory of the Mongolian People's Party, retaining only 9 of 76 seats in the Great Khural. While they just lost under 2% of the popular vote, a new electoral law passed by the Democratic Party itself when in Government to promote two-party politics, together with a 14% rise of the MPP, ended up making them lose 25 of 34 seats.

2017 presidential election

The Democratic Party's candidate Khaltmaagiin Battulga narrowly won the 2017 presidential election.

2020 parliamentary election 

In June 2020, DP got only 11 seats of the 76 seats. Ruling MPP won a landslide victory in the election.

2021 Presidential election 

In the 2021 Mongolian presidential election, DP fell to the third place with only 6.37% of the popular vote and thus lost the presidency. The MPP secured a landslide victory with 72.02% of the popular vote. The Social democratic Right Person Electorate Coalition (RPEC) finished second.

In early 2022, DP selected ex-President Khaltmaagiin Battulga as its new chairman but due to party's internal division his selection was challenged and Battulga's official filing with the Supreme Court has been stalled.

List of Leaders
 Mendsaikhany Enkhsaikhan, 2002–2005
 Radnaasümbereliin Gonchigdorj, 2005–2006
 Tsakhiagiin Elbegdorj, 2006–2008
 Norovyn Altankhuyag, 2008–2014
 Zandaakhuugiin Enkhbold, 2014–2016
 Sodnomzundui Erdene, 2016–2020
 Khaltmaagiin Battulga, 2022–present

Organization
The party is organized on national, provincial, municipal and district levels. Currently, the party has around 30 provincial party associations and 432 grassroots organizations. 
 National Convention (NC): Each provincial association sends delegates to the National Convention, which is held every 4 years.
 National Consultative Committee (NCC): No more than two times a year, NCC is organized and there are 228 members of NCC.

Affiliated organizations
Democratic Party has the following affiliated groups and organizations.
 Democratic Youth Union
 Democratic Women's Union
 Democratic Elders' Union

Electoral history

Presidential elections

State Great Khural elections

References

External links

2000 establishments in Mongolia
Centre-right parties in Asia
International Democrat Union member parties
Liberal conservative parties
Liberal parties in Asia
Mongolian nationalism
Nationalist parties in Asia
Political parties established in 2000
Political parties in Mongolia